The 2010 CFL season is the 57th season of modern-day Canadian football.  Officially, it is the 53rd Canadian Football League season. Commonwealth Stadium in Edmonton hosted the 98th Grey Cup on November 28 when the Montreal Alouettes became the first team to repeat as Grey Cup Champions in 13 years, defeating the Saskatchewan Roughriders, 21–18.  The league announced on its Twitter page on January 29, 2010 that the season would start on July 1, 2010. As of 2021 this is the most recent CFL regular season to start in July.

CFL news in 2010

CFL retro

As the league approaches the 100th Grey Cup, the CFL will celebrate the 1970s with all eight teams wearing retro-themed uniforms from that era during Weeks 6 and 7. Since Saskatchewan's alternate jersey is a version of the 1970s home jersey, they were the only team to wear both home and away retro jerseys during these games.

Additionally, to celebrate the 100th anniversary of the Saskatchewan Roughriders, the players donned red and black centennial jerseys that the team wore from 1912 to 1947 on July 17 when they played Edmonton at Mosaic Stadium at Taylor Field in Regina.

Debut of the Moncton Series
The CFL will begin a series of annual games in Moncton, New Brunswick during the 2010 season. The first game, marketed under the "Touchdown Atlantic" banner took place on September 26, as the Edmonton Eskimos defeated the Toronto Argonauts, 24–6, in front of a sold out crowd of 20,725 at the new Moncton Stadium. Tickets for the game sold out within 32 hours of going on sale. The success of Touchdown Atlantic 2010 has moved Moncton towards a position of candidate for CFL expansion.

Labour agreement
The collective bargaining agreement between the CFL and the CFL Players' Association expires on June 5, 2010. Negotiations between the two parties have been stalled since October 2009; a meeting is scheduled on April 26, 2010 in Toronto. Stu Laird, president of the CFLPA, has sent e-mails to all players. According to Canwest News Service, the e-mails advise the players to remain unified and "It continues to be the opinion of the executive committee that a CFL management lockout of the players is a very real possibility."

On June 29, 2010, two days before the start of the regular season, it was announced that the CFL and CFLPA had agreed to a new 4-year CBA, set to expire before the 2014 CFL season. While many changes were made, the most prominent were those made to the salaries and the introduction of a drug policy. The 2010 team salary cap is set at $4,250,000 with a team salary floor of $3,900,000 and a minimum player salary of $42,000. The salary cap is set to increase $50,000 per season, reaching $4,400,000 by 2013, with the floor being $4,000,000 by that time. The minimum player salary is set to increase by $1000 per season until 2013 where it would be $45,000.

Rule changes
Like in the 2009 CFL season, another fan contest on what rule changes the fans wanted to see was done, this time the fans were asked by Commissioner Mark Cohon to focus on what changes could be made to the overtime format to improve it. While a complete overhaul of the format such as going to a "mini game" of playing two 5 minute no quarter halves or eliminating over time in the regular season, fans endorsed the current overtime format with one significant change. The four rules changes for the season approved by the rules committee, including a change to overtime the fans call on in the contest, are as follows:

Changes to overtime

 Teams that score a touchdown in overtime must go for a two-point convert by running or passing the ball into the end zone instead of kicking for a single point. A similar rule is used in United States intercollegiate football, where a similar overtime is used, starting with the third overtime session (overtime sessions are unlimited). This rule has been experimented in other football leagues like the World Football League and the XFL.

Changes in regulation

 Will allow a team that gives up a field goal the option of scrimmaging from its 35-yard line instead of receiving a kick-off. In 2009, this option was eliminated, but has been overturned as it failed to make any significant difference in entertainment value as it was intended, and was unpopular with the coaches.
 Will ensure there is no penalty for pass interference applied if a forward pass is deemed uncatchable.
 Fixing the no yards or halo rule that will result in a penalty of five instead of fifteen yards when a ball is punted, hits the ground and hits a player from the covering team.

Broadcasting
TSN remains the exclusive broadcaster for all CFL games in Canada. In the United States, the CFL ended its longstanding agreement with America One and signed a more limited deal with NFL Network, which will air 14 games for the season (as opposed to the roughly 70 games per year carried by America One). As with America One, NFL Network will simulcast the TSN broadcast. RDS remains the exclusive French broadcaster of the CFL showing all 18 Montreal Alouettes regular season games and all of the CFL Playoffs.

Records and milestones
On October 11, 2010, Ben Cahoon became the CFL's all-time reception leader, catching his 1,007th career pass from Anthony Calvillo in a home game against the Calgary Stampeders.
November 7, 2010 saw the first time that a regular season Buffalo Bills home game at Rogers Centre in Toronto had been played during the regular CFL season; the Bills against the Chicago Bears kicked off at 1.00pm, while the Toronto Argonauts kicked off their final regular season game at the Montreal Alouettes at 4.00pm.

Regular season 
Note: GP = Games Played, W = Wins, L = Losses, T = Ties, PF = Points For, PA = Points Against, Pts = Points

Teams in bold are currently in playoff positions.

Award winners

CFL Player of the WeekSourceCFL Player of the MonthSourceCFL playoffs

The Montreal Alouettes became the first team to repeat as Grey Cup Champions in 13 years, defeating the Saskatchewan Roughriders, 21–18 at Edmonton's Commonwealth Stadium. Alouettes' wide receiver Jamel Richardson was named the Grey Cup Most Valuable Player, and Roughriders' defensive tackle, Keith Shologan was named the Grey Cup Most Valuable Canadian.

Playoff bracket

*-Team won in Double Overtime.

CFL Leaders
 CFL Passing Leaders
 CFL Rushing Leaders
 CFL Receiving Leaders

2010 CFL All-Stars

Offence
QB – Henry Burris, Calgary Stampeders
RB – Cory Boyd, Toronto Argonauts
RB – Fred Reid, Winnipeg Blue Bombers
WR – Arland Bruce III, Hamilton Tiger-Cats
SB – Andy Fantuz, Saskatchewan Roughriders
SB – Nik Lewis, Calgary Stampeders
WR – Terrence Edwards, Winnipeg Blue Bombers
OT – Ben Archibald, Calgary Stampeders
OT – Rob Murphy, Toronto Argonauts
OG – Scott Flory, Montreal Alouettes
OG – Dimitri Tsoumpas, Calgary Stampeders
OC – Marwan Hage, Hamilton Tiger-Cats

Defence
DT – Doug Brown, Winnipeg Blue Bombers
DT – Kevin Huntley, Toronto Argonauts
DE – Phillip Hunt, Winnipeg Blue Bombers
DE – John Bowman, Montreal Alouettes
LB – Chip Cox, Montreal Alouettes
LB – Markeith Knowlton, Hamilton Tiger-Cats
LB – Juwan Simpson, Calgary Stampeders
CB – Dwight Anderson, Calgary Stampeders
CB – Brandon Browner, Calgary Stampeders
DB – Ryan Phillips, BC Lions
DB – Chris Thompson, Edmonton Eskimos
S –  James Patrick, Saskatchewan Roughriders

Special teams
K – Paul McCallum, BC Lions
P – Burke Dales, Calgary Stampeders
ST – Chad Owens, Toronto Argonauts

2010 CFL Western All-Stars

Offence
QB – Henry Burris, Calgary Stampeders
RB – Wes Cates, Saskatchewan Roughriders
RB – Joffrey Reynolds, Calgary Stampeders
WR – Romby Bryant, Calgary Stampeders
SB – Andy Fantuz, Saskatchewan Roughriders
SB – Nik Lewis, Calgary Stampeders
WR – Fred Stamps, Edmonton Eskimos
OT – Ben Archibald, Calgary Stampeders
OT – Gene Makowsky, Saskatchewan Roughriders
OG – Jovan Olafioye, BC Lions
OG – Dimitri Tsoumpas, Calgary Stampeders
OC – Jeremy O'Day, Saskatchewan Roughriders

Defence
DT – DeVone Claybrooks, Calgary Stampeders
DT – Tom Johnson, Calgary Stampeders
DE – Charleston Hughes, Calgary Stampeders
DE – Brent Johnson, BC Lions
LB – Korey Banks, BC Lions
LB – Barrin Simpson, Saskatchewan Roughriders
LB – Juwan Simpson, Calgary Stampeders
CB – Dwight Anderson, Calgary Stampeders
CB – Brandon Browner, Calgary Stampeders
DB – Ryan Phillips, BC Lions
DB – Chris Thompson, Edmonton Eskimos
S –  James Patrick, Saskatchewan Roughriders

Special teams
K – Paul McCallum, BC Lions
P – Burke Dales, Calgary Stampeders
ST – Yonus Davis, BC Lions

2010 CFL Eastern All-Stars

Offence
QB – Anthony Calvillo, Montreal Alouettes
RB – Cory Boyd, Toronto Argonauts
RB – Fred Reid, Winnipeg Blue Bombers
WR – Arland Bruce III, Hamilton Tiger-Cats
WR – Terrence Edwards, Winnipeg Blue Bombers
WR – Jamel Richardson, Montreal Alouettes
WR – Dave Stala, Hamilton Tiger-Cats
OT – Josh Bourke, Montreal Alouettes
OT – Rob Murphy, Toronto Argonauts
OG – Scott Flory, Montreal Alouettes
OG – Brendon LaBatte, Winnipeg Blue Bombers
OC – Marwan Hage, Hamilton Tiger-Cats

Defence
DT – Doug Brown, Winnipeg Blue Bombers
DT – Kevin Huntley, Toronto Argonauts
DE – John Bowman, Montreal Alouettes
DE – Phillip Hunt, Winnipeg Blue Bombers
LB – Chip Cox, Montreal Alouettes
LB – Kevin Eiben, Toronto Argonauts
LB – Markeith Knowlton, Hamilton Tiger-Cats
CB – Mark Estelle, Montreal Alouettes
CB – Jovon Johnson, Winnipeg Blue Bombers
DB – Jerald Brown, Montreal Alouettes
DB – Lin-J Shell, Toronto Argonauts
S – Willie Pile, Toronto Argonauts

Special teams
K – Damon Duval, Montreal Alouettes
P – Mike Renaud, Winnipeg Blue Bombers
ST – Chad Owens, Toronto Argonauts

2010 CFLPA Pro Player All-Stars

Offence
QB: Anthony Calvillo, Montreal Alouettes
OT: Ben Archibald, Calgary Stampeders
OT: Dan Goodspeed, Saskatchewan Roughriders
OG: Cedric Gagne-Marcoux, Toronto Argonauts
OG: Patrick Kabongo, Edmonton Eskimos
C: Marwan Hage, Hamilton Tiger Cats
RB: Cory Boyd, Toronto Argonauts
RB: Fred Reid, Winnipeg Blue Bombers
SB: Arland Bruce III, Hamilton Tiger Cats
SB: Fred Stamps, Edmonton Eskimos
WR: Romby Bryant. Calgary Stampeders
WR: Jamal Richardson, Montreal Alouettes

Defence
DE: Phillip Hunt, Winnipeg Blue Bombers
DE: Odell Willis, Winnipeg Blue Bombers
DT: Doug Brown, Winnipeg Blue Bombers
DT: Dario Romero, Edmonton Eskimos
LB: Chip Cox, Montreal Alouettes
LB: Barrin Simpson, Saskatchewan Roughriders
LB: Solomon Elimimian, BC Lions
CB: Brandon Browner, Calgary Stampeders
CB: Dwight Anderson Calgary Stampeders
HB: Korey Banks, BC Lions
HB: Chris Thompson, Edmonton Eskimos
S: James Patrick, Saskatchewan Roughriders

Special teams
PK: Paul McCallum, BC Lions
KR/PR: Chad Owens, Toronto Argonauts
P: Burke Dales, Calgary Stampeders

Head coach
HC:  Jim Barker, Toronto ArgonautsSource''

2010 Gibson's Finest CFL Awards
CFL's Most Outstanding Player Award – Henry Burris (QB), Calgary Stampeders
CFL's Most Outstanding Canadian Award – Andy Fantuz (SB), Saskatchewan Roughriders
CFL's Most Outstanding Defensive Player Award – Markeith Knowlton (DB), Hamilton Tiger-Cats
CFL's Most Outstanding Offensive Lineman Award – Ben Archibald (OT), Calgary Stampeders
CFL's Most Outstanding Rookie Award – Solomon Elimimian (LB), BC Lions
John Agro Special Teams Award – Chad Owens (WR), Toronto Argonauts
Tom Pate Memorial Award – Wes Lysack (DB), Calgary Stampeders
Jake Gaudaur Veterans' Trophy – Mike McCullough (LB), Saskatchewan Roughriders
Annis Stukus Trophy – Jim Barker, Toronto Argonauts
Commissioner's Award – Rider Nation (The award was given to the entire Rider fan base; it is usually only given to an individual).
Hugh Campbell Distinguished Leadership Award - Tony Proudfoot, Montreal Alouettes

References 

Canadian Football League seasons
Cfl Season, 2010